Sugarloaf Mountain near the town of Patrick (Chesterfield County, South Carolina) is an unusual hill, known locally as "The Mountain," that towers a hundred feet above the surrounding terrain.  This site is located within the Sand Hills State Forest, just off US highway 1, near Patrick, South Carolina in the Carolina Sandhills region of the U.S. Atlantic Coastal Plain province.

Geology 
On published geologic maps of the area, Sugarloaf Mountain is mapped as part of the Middendorf Formation, a sequence of sandstone, pebbly sandstone, sand, silt, and clay that are interpreted as fluvial (river) deposits that accumulated during the Cretaceous Period. While much of the mountain is composed of unconsolidated to semi-consolidated beds of quartz-rich sand, silt, and clay, outcrops and boulders of iron-cemented, pebbly sandstone can  be found both on the mountain-side and the immediate vicinity. The iron-rich cement holding these sandstones together likely precipitated from groundwater interactions.

Biology 
Wildlife is abundant.  Flora/fauna include whitetail deer, turkeys, quail, wood ducks, fish, black squirrels and flying squirrels as well as rhododendron, moss, lichen, ferns. Some of these plants are rare for the area. The Red-cockaded woodpecker resides here. You might even see a Pine Barrens tree frog. Hunting is allowed in a few areas as it is treated as a Wildlife Management Area of South Carolina.

There are timber rattlesnakes, black racers, and water moccasins during the spring, summer, and fall.

Camping 

There are plenty of primitive camping sites(16 total). You must reserve them in advance. Call (843) 498–6478 to reserve. They are 15 dollars a night for sheltered sites, 10 dollars for non sheltered sites. There is no electricity or water/sewage. However, there are two small outhouses located at Site 1 and Site 6. There is plenty of acreage at each site to set up multiple tents. Keep fires contained in the provided fire pits. Do not create fires outside of the pits as there are only Pine Trees and straw on the ground which can ignite quickly. There is also plenty of room for to throw football or baseball, play frisbee golf, cornhole, or create a game and play i.e. such as botchi-golf.

Hiking 
There are a few marked hiking trails. The woods are wide open with little underbrush. The sand makes for very easy primitive hikes around the "mountain." Take sufficient beverages and water because of the length of hikes. Be cautious and alert for wildlife  To get to the base of the mountain, stop just past camp site number 6 and it is on the left. There's a parking area to indicate this. Also, directly across from the main "mountain", there is also what is known locally as, "Little Sugarloaf." It's a little harder to find, so look for the small sign to ascend. The view is not quite as good though.

Horses 
"Trails of red clay and patches of white sand through an assorted forest of new and old growth dogwoods, pine, and hardwoods. During your ride you may encounter deer, fox squirrels, turkey, and possibly an elusive red cockaded woodpecker. All of the trails have something special.

The Pine Barrens Wagon Trail is in service (though not used often). This trail is unique in that it was devoted to horse drawn wagons and buggies. Occasional creeks along the trails provide water for your horse, but even though there are facilities at the trailheads, due to the length of these trails, you might want to carry water for yourself."

Horses do not have to be shod. During warm months, insect repellent is also recommended as there can be mosquitoes and other pesky bugs.

Fishing 
Nearby, there is a large pond, (no swimming), that contains fish such as bream, redbreast, and crappie. An occasional small catfish may be caught. No outboards are allowed, but canoes and kayaks are welcome.

References 

Hills of South Carolina